Buck Mountain is a summit in southern St. Francois County in the U.S. state of Missouri. The mountain lies east of Missouri Route V about six miles northeast of Pilot Knob and about six miles southwest of Doe Run.

Buck Mountain was so named on account of deer in the area.

References

Mountains of St. Francois County, Missouri
Mountains of Missouri